The following is a list of intestinal stem cell marker genes, including their name and known function.

Intestinal stem cells 

In the adult intestine, the crypts of Lieberkühn are the niche for epithelial stem cells and contain all proliferative stem and progenitor cells. Differentiating cells exit the cell cycle and migrate out of the crypts and onto the surface epithelium of the intestine, where they perform their physiological role (e.g., nutrient absorption by enterocytes; mucous secretion by goblet cells) and are eventually shed into the lumen. Intestinal stem cells were first identified as such in the 1970s. Cheng and Leblond used autoradiography of phagosomes to track the fate of cells at the base of the crypts, and determined that slender cells interspersed among Paneth cells at the crypt base could give rise to all of the other cell types that constituted the intestinal epithelium.  Due to their narrow shape and location, these cells were called crypt base columnar cells (CBCs). Potten and colleagues used a combination of DNA labeling and assessment of the response of the epithelium to high-dose radiation to identify label-retaining cells (LRCs) as putative stem cells, which were typically located around four cell positions above the bottom of the crypt, and were therefore also called "+4 cells". Later work suggested that these "+4 cells" may function as reserve or back-up stem cells, and further suggested that they divide slowly relative to the other progenitor cells in the crypt. Thus, these cells are also called quiescent stem cells.

The stem cell zone model states that the CBC stem cells reside in a stem-cell-permissive environment. These cycling stem cells regularly generate progeny, which subsequently exit the niche and pass through the “common origin of differentiation” around position +5, where they commit toward the various individual lineages. Progenitors mature as they migrate upward onto the villus. Maturing Paneth cell progenitors migrate downward, with the oldest Paneth cells residing at the very base of the crypt. In accordance with the stem cell zone model proposing that, during their upward migration, CBC stem cells would only gradually lose their self-renewal capacity, it was shown in vivo that transient amplifying cells can revert to Lgr5+ CBC stem cells after damage, presumably by direct contact with Paneth cells.

Molecular markers of intestinal stem cells 

More recently modern genetics techniques, primarily using transgenic mice, have been used to identify genes that are specifically expressed or highly enriched in the intestinal stem cells. Below, a table of intestinal stem cell "marker" genes is given, along with a notation if this marks active of CBC stem cells, or quiescent/reserve/+4 stem cells.

Additional possible markers:	
CD24
CD44v6
Active beta-catenin
Pcdh8  21419747 
 

Stem cells
Digestive system
Genes